Gravity is the sixth studio album by Welsh heavy metal band Bullet for My Valentine. The album was released on 29 June 2018 via Spinefarm Records, their first album under the label. It is the first album with former Pitchshifter drummer Jason Bowld, who joined in 2016 to replace founding drummer Michael "Moose" Thomas. 
It is also the first album to feature bassist Jamie Mathias as a contributing member. Gravity represents a significant change in sound compared to the band's previous releases, moving toward the nu metal sound similar to their early years as "Jeff Killed John".

On 1 April 2018, Bullet for My Valentine debuted "Over It", the first single from Gravity, on BBC Radio 1.

Critical reception
Upon its release, Gravity has received mixed-to-negative reviews from critics, primarily due to the band's departure from their signature metalcore/thrash metal sound to a more nu metal style. Jeff Treppel of MetalSucks gave the album an extremely negative 0.5 out of 5, criticizing the sound for being a "bastard hybrid of Linkin Park-style radio rock" as well as the album's lyrical content and Matt Tuck's vocals. A significantly more positive review came from Lukas Wojcicki of Exclaim!, who stated that the "newly implemented formula works as intended", and commented that the "tracks are easily digestible and regrettably catchy", although stated that "metal purists" would find the album "frustrating".

Track listing

Personnel
Bullet for My Valentine
 Matt Tuck – lead vocals, rhythm guitar
 Michael "Padge" Paget – lead guitar, backing vocals
 Jamie Mathias – bass guitar, backing vocals
 Jason Bowld – drums

Technical
 Carl Bown – production, mixing, keyboards
 Colin Richardson – production on "Don't Need You"
 Alex Robinson – mixing assistant
 Daniel Holub – art direction, design
 Ted Jensen – mastering at Sterling Sound, NYC

Charts

References

2018 albums
Bullet for My Valentine albums
Spinefarm Records albums
Nu metal albums by British artists